Ahmad Al-Bishi (born 2 September 1962) is a Saudi Arabian footballer. He competed in the men's tournament at the 1984 Summer Olympics.

References

External links
 

1962 births
Living people
Saudi Arabian footballers
Saudi Arabia international footballers
Olympic footballers of Saudi Arabia
Footballers at the 1984 Summer Olympics
Saudi Professional League players
Al-Qadsiah FC players
Place of birth missing (living people)
Association football defenders